The following is a list of pipeline accidents in the United States in 2007. It is one of several lists of U.S. pipeline accidents. See also list of natural gas and oil production accidents in the United States.

Incidents 

This is not a complete list of all pipeline accidents. For natural gas alone, the Pipeline and Hazardous Materials Safety Administration (PHMSA), a United States Department of Transportation agency, has collected data on more than 3,200 accidents deemed serious or significant since 1987.

A "significant incident" results in any of the following consequences:
 fatality or injury requiring in-patient hospitalization
 $50,000 or more in total costs, measured in 1984 dollars
 releases resulting in an unintentional fire or explosion

PHMSA and the National Transportation Safety Board (NTSB) post incident data and results of investigations into accidents involving pipelines that carry a variety of products, including natural gas, oil, diesel fuel, gasoline, kerosene, jet fuel, carbon dioxide, and other substances. Occasionally pipelines are repurposed to carry different products.

 On January 1, an Enbridge pipeline that runs from Superior, Wisconsin to near Whitewater, Wisconsin failed, resulting in a spill of 1,500 barrels of crude oil onto farmland and into a drainage ditch. Incomplete fusion of a longitudinal weld at the pipe maker that failed as pressure cycled was established as the cause.
 On February 2, a construction crew struck an Enbridge pipeline in Rusk County, Wisconsin with equipment, spilling  of crude oil, of which only 2,066 barrels were recovered.
 On February 17, in a rural area of Harris County, Texas, a Tennessee Gas Pipeline transmission pipeline was damaged, and later exploded and burned. Grass fires spread across a three-square mile rural area. The 31-inch natural gas pipeline leaked after a bulldozer hit it. Residents reported a loud explosion that shook houses enough to set off car alarms, as well as a rumbling sound and a bright orange fireball in the sky. Firefighters "backfilled" the break with nitrogen. PHMSA reported 1 person injured.
 On March 12, new pipeline construction equipment hit an existing natural gas transmission pipeline near Lake Weatherford, in Parker County, Texas. A massive fire followed, but there were no injuries. 
 On March 29, near Yutan, Nebraska, a pipeline was hit by construction equipment. About 1,697 barrels of natural gasoline were lost.
 On April 27, a  gas transmission pipeline failed near Pawnee, Illinois. The rupture and resulting fire resulted in the evacuation of a residence and the death of farm animals. The failure was due to external corrosion.
 On May 4, a backhoe helping to lay a gas pipeline hit another gas pipeline in Weatherford, Texas. The gas ignited, sending flames hundreds of feet into the air. Vehicles, equipment, and power lines in the area were destroyed, but there were no injuries.
The Kerris and Helfrick company owns the property where the gas leak occurred, and the excavator, was working for the company when he accidentally ruptured the Sunoco Logistics 14-inch petroleum pipeline. The gasoline was mostly absorbed into areas of soil, fill and coal strippings at the site. Several residents made U.S. Rep. Christopher P. Carney aware of complaints about gasoline odors in residential basements. "Moreover, many residents are legitimately concerned about groundwater contamination as well as a host of future problems associated with the spill", Carney wrote to Department of Environmental Protection Secretary Kathleen McGinty. The pipeline was installed in 1964 by the Atlantic Richfield Co.(ARCO) and purchased in 1990 by Sunoco. On September 29, the PADEP Environmental Cleanup program finalized a consent order and agreement with Mallard Contracting, which included a $45,000 civil penalty covering both DEP's response costs and a fine for violations of the Pa. Solid Waste Management Act.
 In August, a gas compressor turbine caught fire inside BP's Gathering Center 1 in Alaska, after an oil hose ruptured and spewed flammable liquid across the motor. A mechanic on patrol in the facility — seeing smoke — fled the room as the turbine burst into flames. Automatic fire and gas alarms were never triggered. A subsequent investigation by Alaska state authorities found that a ruptured hydraulic oil hose was Jerry-rigged in a position that chaffed against the turbine's hot engine. The investigation also found that the facility's fire and gas detectors were not powered on at the time.
 On October 8, a gas pipeline at a gas storage facility in Salem, Michigan ruptured and caught fire. Siding was melted on nearby houses.
 On October 18, an ethylene pipeline explosion early, was heard for miles around Port Arthur, Texas, waking residents. The following fire spread to a nearby butadiene pipeline, causing it to rupture and burn. Later, over 300 residents sued the pipeline's owners for health issues claimed to be caused from the chemicals released by the accident. External corrosion of the ethylene pipeline caused the first pipeline failure.
 On November 1, a 12-inch propane pipeline exploded, killing two people, and injuring five others, near Carmichael in the southeast portion of Clarke County, Mississippi. The NTSB determined the probable cause was an LF-ERW seam failure. During hydrostatic testing of the pipeline after repair, another LF-ERW seam failed nearby. Inadequate education of residents near the pipeline about the existence of this pipeline, and how to respond to a pipeline accident, were also cited as a factors in the deaths.
 On November 12, three teenaged boys drilled into an ammonia pipeline, in Tampa Bay, Florida, causing a major ammonia leak. They later claimed they did it due to stories of money being hidden inside that pipeline. The leak took two days to be capped. One of the teens had serious chemical burns from the ammonia. Residents within a half mile from the leak were evacuated. PHMSA later noted the pipeline company failed to adequately plan for emergencies with the local Fire Agency, as required by CFR 195.402(c)(12).
 On November 13, Enbridge discovered a leak on their 34-inch Line 3, at Mile Post 912, near Clearbrook, Minnesota. Later, the pipeline exploded during repairs, on November 27, causing the deaths of two employees. DOT officials said that two Enbridge workers died in a crude oil explosion as they worked to make repairs on the former Lakehead system pipeline. Enbridge was cited for failing to safely and adequately perform maintenance and repair activities, clear the designated work area from possible sources of ignition, and hire properly trained and qualified workers.
 On November 21, a 30-inch gas transmission pipeline failed, near Haven, Kansas. The gas ignited, resulting in road closures.
 On December 14, two men were driving east in a pickup truck, on Interstate 20 near Delhi, Louisiana, when a 30-inch gas transmission pipeline exploded. One of the men were killed, and the other injured. External corrosion was later identified as the cause of the failure.

References 

Lists of pipeline accidents in the United States